The Southend West by-election of 29 January 1959 was held after the death of Conservative Party MP and renowned diarist  Henry Channon.

Electoral history
The seat was very safe, having been won at the 1955 United Kingdom general election by almost 18,500 votes

Candidates
23-year old Paul Channon was selected by the Conservatives after the death of his father, Sir Henry Channon. A company director. Born October, 1935; educated at Lockers Park, Hemel Hempstead, Eton, and Christ Church, Oxford.
Labour's candidate was 35-year old Anthony Pearson-Clarke, a deputy headmaster. Born November, 1923; educated at St. Luke's College School and Training College, Exeter, Battersea Polytechnic, and Ruskin College, Oxford. A former weekly newspaper editor and local government officer.
The Liberal Party selected 59-year old Miss Heather Joan Harvey. She had contested the division in 1955 and Esher in 1950 and 1951. She was a writer and was engaged in historical research. She was educated privately at Prior's Field School, Godalming, and Newnham College, Cambridge, where she graduated in 1921 with first-class honours, economics tripos. She joined the Royal Institute of International Affairs, Chatham House, in 1931. She became secretary of the Study Groups Department in 1935. She was a temporary Civil servant in the Foreign Office, 1939–45. She served with the United Nations 1945-46 as deputy administrative secretary. She was Hon. treasurer, Women's Liberal Federation, a member of Liberal Party Organization Council and executive committee. She was Joint honorary treasurer of the Liberal Party organization.

Result

Aftermath

References

1959 in England
By-election, 1959
1959 elections in the United Kingdom
By-elections to the Parliament of the United Kingdom in Essex constituencies
1950s in Essex
January 1959 events in the United Kingdom